The Scout and Guide movement in Nicaragua is served by
 Federación Nacional de Muchachas Guías de Nicaragua, member of the World Association of Girl Guides and Girl Scouts
 Asociación de Scouts de Nicaragua, member of the World Organization of the Scout Movement

See also